The 2003 Basildon District Council election took place on 1 May 2003 to elect members of Basildon District Council in Essex, England. One third of the council was up for election and the Conservative party gained overall control of the council from no overall control.

After the election, the composition of the council was
Conservative 23
Labour 14
Liberal Democrats 3
Basildon Independent Residents 2

Background
The previous election in 2002 saw the Conservatives win exactly half of the seats, but Labour remained in control of the council with the support of the Liberal Democrats. However 6 months before the 2003 election 2 Labour councillors defected and the Conservatives took over the administration of the council.

Election result
The results saw the Conservatives win a majority for only the second time in the history of Basildon council.

Following the election the Labour leader on the council Nigel Smith was replaced by his group with Paul Kirkman.

Ward results

Billericay East

Billericay West

Burstead

Fryerns

Laindon Park

Lee Chapel North

Nethermayne

Pitsea North West

Pitsea South East

St Martin's

Vange

Wickford Castledon

Wickford North

Wickford Park

References

2003
2003 English local elections
2000s in Essex